Fort Humphreys may refer to:

Fort Belvoir in Virginia, known as Camp A. A. Humphreys from 1917 to 1922 and as Fort Humphreys from 1922 to 1935
Fort Lesley J. McNair in Washington, D.C., known as Fort Humphreys from 1935 to 1948